Vítor Gialorenco Huvos commonly known as Vítor Huvos (born 8 July 1988) is a retired Brazilian footballer.

Personal life
On 10 October 2007, he received his Italian passport and hence he shares dual-citizenship between Brazil and Italy.

Club career

Brazil
Huvos began his professional career in Brazil with his parent club Atlético Clube Juventus. He did not make any official appearance for the club though in his one-year spell with the Rio Branco-based club.

Switzerland
Just after spending a year with his first professional club in his home country, he moved to Europe and more accurately to Switzerland where he signed a one-year contract with Swiss Super League club Grasshopper Club Zürich. He made 8 league appearances and scored one goal for the Zürich-based club, hence helping them to secure the 4th position in the 2008–09 Swiss Super League. During his one-year spell with the club, he also moved on-loan to Swiss Challenge League club FC Stade Nyonnais for whom he made 9 league appearances.

Romania
In 2009, he moved to another European country and this time to Romania where he signed a one-year contract with Liga II club FC Universitatea Cluj. He made 22 appearances and scored 7 goals for the club in the 2009–10 Liga II, helping them to secure the 2nd position in the 2009–10 Liga II hence earning them a place in the 2010–11 Liga I.

Spain
On 1 September 2010, he signed as a free agent for Segunda División B club Atlético Madrid B from the Romanian club FC Universitatea Cluj. He made his debut for the Madrid-based club on 26 September 2010 in a 2-1 loss against UD Vecindario.  He made 12 appearances for the club in the 2010–11 Segunda División B.

Back to Brazil
In 2012, he came back to Brazil after a five-year-long spell in Europe and signed a short-term contract with Botafogo Futebol Clube. He did not make any appearance for the club in the 2012 Campeonato Paulista but he represented the team as a substitute on 22 January 2012 in a 4-0 loss against São Paulo FC.

Thailand
In 2013, he again made a far away from his nation Brazil to Thailand where he signed a one-year contract with Thai Premier League club Chainat Hornbill F.C. He made 14 appearances and scored 7 goals for the Chainat-based club in the 2013 Thai Premier League, hence helping them secure the 10th position in the 2013 Thai Premier League.

Oman

Saham SC

On 1 September 2014, he signed a one-year contract with 2014 GCC Champions League runners-up Saham Club. He made his Oman Professional League debut and scored his first goal on 13 September 2014 in a 3-0 win over Al-Oruba SC. He made his Sultan Qaboos Cup debut on 1 December 2014 in a 3-0 win over Masirah SC. He also made his Oman Professional League Cup debut and scored his first goal in the competition on 13 November 2014 in a 3-1 win over 2013-14 Oman Professional League winners, Al-Nahda Club. He scored 2 goals in 11 appearances in the 2014-15 Oman Professional League. He also scored 2 goals in 6 appearances in the 2014–15 Oman Professional League Cup and helped his side advance to the Quarter-finals stage of the competition where his side narrowly lost 2-1 to 2013–14 Sultan Qaboos Cup winners, Fanja SC.

On 18 August 2015, he signed a one-year contract extension with the Saham-based club. He made his first appearance in the 2015-16 Oman Professional League on 14 September 2015 in a 2-1 win over Al-Khaboura SC. After the match against Al-Shabab Club on 21 September 2015, the club management decided to part company with the Italian footballer of Brazilian origin.

Bahrain
In January 2016, he again made a move to the Middle East and this time to the Kingdom of Bahrain where he signed a six-month contract with Bahraini Second Division club Bahrain SC.

Club career statistics

References

External links
Vítor Huvos - GOAL.com
Vítor Huvos - FootballDatabase.eu
Vítor Huvos - GOALZZ.com
Vítor Huvos - KOOORA.com

1988 births
Living people
Footballers from São Paulo
Brazilian footballers
Italian footballers
Brazilian people of Italian descent
Brazilian expatriate footballers
Italian expatriate footballers
Association football midfielders
Clube Atlético Juventus players
Grasshopper Club Zürich players
FC Stade Nyonnais players
FC Universitatea Cluj players
Atlético Madrid B players
Botafogo Futebol Clube (SP) players
Vitor Huvos
Saham SC players
Swiss Super League players
Swiss Challenge League players
Liga II players
Segunda División B players
Vitor Huvos
Oman Professional League players
Expatriate footballers in Switzerland
Brazilian expatriate sportspeople in Switzerland
Italian expatriate sportspeople in Switzerland
Expatriate footballers in Romania
Brazilian expatriate sportspeople in Romania
Italian expatriate sportspeople in Romania
Expatriate footballers in Spain
Brazilian expatriate sportspeople in Spain
Italian expatriate sportspeople in Spain
Expatriate footballers in Thailand
Brazilian expatriate sportspeople in Thailand
Italian expatriate sportspeople in Thailand
Expatriate footballers in Oman
Brazilian expatriate sportspeople in Oman
Italian expatriate sportspeople in Oman